Belo Horizonte/Confins – Tancredo Neves International Airport , formerly called Confins International Airport, is the primary international airport serving Belo Horizonte. Since 2 September 1986, the airport is named after Tancredo de Almeida Neves (1910–1985), President-elect of Brazil. It is located in the municipality of Confins, in the state of Minas Gerais. It is operated by BH Airport S.A.

History
The airport was built by Infraero and inaugurated in 1984. Its purpose was to lessen the congestion at Pampulha Airport, which at the time was operating at 120% of its capacity of 1.3 million passengers per year. It was expected that by 1990, passenger movement at Confins would be nearly 2 million passengers per year. However, it surpassed the 1 million passenger mark only 22 years later. Presently its maximum operational capacity is 22 million passengers per year.

After its inauguration, just a small fraction of the capacity of Confins was used. This was partly due to its distance from downtown Belo Horizonte and, until recently, to the lack of satisfactory transportation alternatives for the pricey (about US$40) taxi rides. The over-crowded Pampulha Airport remained the airport of choice.

In order to revert this scenario, in March 2005 the government of the state of Minas Gerais with the support of agencies of the Federal government decided to restrict Pampulha to operations of aircraft with capacity of up to 50 passengers. In the months thereafter, most operations were forced to move to Confins and the airport gained a new momentum. At that time, 130 flights were transferred from Pampulha to Confins, increasing annual passenger flow from 350,000 to around 3.0 million that year.

The problems related to the distance of Confins to downtown Belo Horizonte were lessened by recent projects such as the improvement of the highway that links the city center to the airport (MG-10 highway), part of a larger project called Linha Verde (Green Line), which seeks to reduce the time needed to reach the airport. Another project called the "Industrial Airport" is underway. In this project the government will exempt tax of businesses interested in settling their operations near the airport.

Its cargo facilities have a capacity of handling 18.000 tones (39.682.000 lb) and the warehouse has 6.400 m2 (68.889 ft²).

The main maintenance facilities of Gol Airlines are located at this airport.

On 26 April 2011 it was confirmed that in order to speed-up much needed renovation and upgrade works, private companies would be granted a concession to explore some Infraero airports - among them, in a later phase, Confins. The plan was confirmed on 31 May 2011 and it was added that Infraero would retain 49% of the shares of each privatized airport and that negotiations were expected to be concluded in the first half of 2012.

On 22 November 2013 the Brazilian Government had a bidding process to determine the operator of the airport from 2014 until 2044. The group BH Airport formed by CCR (75%) and the administrator of Munich and Zurich Airports (25%) won the competition.

On 16 September 2015, all international operations were transferred to a new provisional terminal - Terminal 3 while domestic operations remained in Terminal 1.

The construction of Terminal 2 - an extension of Terminal 1 - started in September 2015 and finished in December 2016. It increased the airports capacity to 22 million passengers per year. On 8 December 2016 Terminal 2 was opened for domestic operations and in January 2017 international operations were transferred from Terminal 3. With the transfer of operations, Terminal 3 was closed.

Future developments
On 31 August 2009, the previous concessionary, Infraero, unveiled a BRL342.3 million (US$180.3 million; EUR126.4 million) investment plan to upgrade Tancredo Neves International Airport, focusing on the preparations for the 2014 FIFA World Cup. The investment was supposed to be distributed as follows:
Parking. Value 6.8. Completed: July 2010
Extension of runway, enlargement of apron and cargo terminal, construction of further taxiways. Value 120.0. Completed.
Renovation of the passenger terminal. Value 215.5.

As of March 2016, only the parking lot and the apron expansion works have been completed.

On 26 January 2023, along with its announcement of its weekly service to Curaçao, Azul Brazilian Airlines announced its return to the United States, with three weekly flights to Fort Lauderdale and two weekly flights to Orlando, although dates and times have not been announced, they are expected to come towards the end of 2023.

Airlines and destinations

Passenger

Cargo

Statistics

Accidents and incidents
15 September 2001: a TAM Airlines Fokker 100 registration PT-MRN operating the charter flight 9755, flying from Recife to Campinas-Viracopos, following an uncontrolled engine failure en route to Campinas had 3 cabin windows shattered by fragments of the engine and made an emergency landing at Belo Horizonte-Confins. One passenger was sucked out partly and held by another passenger until the aircraft landed. The passenger did not survive.

Access
It is regularly served by buses, taxis and Executive Airport Shuttle Buses. When using buses, transfer to the subway of Belo Horizonte is possible.

See also

List of airports in Brazil

References

External links

Airports in Minas Gerais
Airports established in 1984
Belo Horizonte